Jilin University of Arts is a university in Changchun, Jilin, China.

History
The Department of Music of Jilin Normal University (current Northeast Normal University) was spun off as Jilin Professional School of the Arts. It was renamed to Jilin University of Arts in 1978.

Alumni
Liang Bo, winner of The Voice of China (season 1)

References

External links

Universities and colleges in Jilin